St Gwenfaen's Well (also known as ,  and ) is an early medieval holy well in the south west of Holy Island, Anglesey, named after St Gwenfaen, whose cloister was nearby. The site includes substantial remains of a building and is both a scheduled monument and a Grade II listed building. Traditionally, a gift of two white quartz pebbles thrown into the pool can cure mental health problems.

Location

St Gwenfaen's Well lies in an isolated position in a cleft in the rock in a dell overlooking the cliffs of Porth Gwalch (Welsh: Hawk Bay) in the community of Rhoscolyn in the south west of Holy Island, Anglesey.

As with much of Holy Island, the well lies within the area of the Glannau Ynys Gybi (Welsh: Holy Island Coast) Site of Special Scientific Interest and the Anglesey Area of Outstanding Natural Beauty.

Description

Three steps descend into the building from the east into a  square chamber with a flagstone floor and four diagonal stone seats in each corner.

An outer external well chamber roughly  square contains the well itself, and is separated from the internal well chamber by a drystone wall, which includes a stone slab with circular grooves cut in its upper and lower edges to allow water to flow between the two chambers. The external chamber can be reached by six descending stone steps on either side cut into the cleft in the rock.

St Gwenfaen's Well has not been accurately dated but is assumed to be medieval. The nearby church dedicated to St Gwenfaen is on the site of an older church dating from 630 AD.

History and legend

Gwenfaen was the daughter of Paul Hen of Manaw (who also known as Old Paulinus), and sister of Peulan and Gwyngeneu, both saints who also lived on Holy Island. She was known for healing mental illness. While being chased by druids, Gwenfaen is said to have climbed a nearby rock stack and was carried away by angels when the tide came in.

An offering of two white quartz pebbles into the water of the well is said to cure mental problems.

Recent history

St Gwenfaen's Well was designated as a Grade II listed building in 1971 and as a scheduled monument in 1987.

The well is blessed every year on, or near, Gwenfaen's Saint's day, 4 November, after Holy Communion in the nearby church.

Access

St Gwenfaen's Well can be reached by footpath, either by a circular route around Rhoscolyn or by following the Anglesey Coastal Path (part of the Wales Coast Path).

See also

List of Scheduled Monuments in Anglesey
St Allgo's Well
St Seiriol's Well

References

Further reading

External links
 – map of part of Anglesey Area of Outstanding Natural Beauty
 – online images
 – gallery of photos including close-ups of features
 – shrines, churches and wells associated with Welsh saints
 – includes Maps 13 to 28 covering the coast of Anglesey

Scheduled monuments in Anglesey
Rhoscolyn
Gwenfaen
Grade II listed buildings in Anglesey